Avery Bourne is a politician who was a Republican member of the Illinois House of Representatives representing the 95th district. She was sworn in to office on February 20, 2015. She was the youngest legislator to be sworn in to the Illinois General Assembly, breaking the record set by John McCandish King in 1950. Bourne was appointed by the Republican chairmen of the four counties that make up the 95th district: Christian, Macoupin, Madison and Montgomery. She was a student at the law school of Washington University in St. Louis, prior to becoming a state representative. Bourne was Richard Irvin's running mate for the Republican primary in the 2022 Illinois gubernatorial election.

As of July 3, 2022, Representative Bourne is a member of the following Illinois House committees:

 Appropriations - Elementary & Secondary Education Committee (HAPE)
 Child Care Access & Early Childhood Education Committee (HCEC)
 Elementary & Secondary Education: Administration, Licenses & Charter Committee (HELO)
 Elementary & Secondary Education: School Curriculum & Policies Committee (HELM)
 Executive Committee (HEXC)
 Redistricting Committee (HRED)

Electoral history

2016

2018

2020

2022

References

External links
Illinois General Assembly Profile

21st-century American politicians
21st-century American women politicians
Columbia College (Missouri) alumni
Living people
Democratic Party members of the Illinois House of Representatives
People from Montgomery County, Illinois
Place of birth missing (living people)
Women state legislators in Illinois
1992 births
Washington University School of Law alumni